Roger Marcel Cicero Ciceu (6 July 1970 – 24 March 2016) was a German jazz and pop musician.

Biography 
Roger Cicero was born in 1970 in Berlin to Romanian jazz pianist Eugen Cicero and dancer Lili Cziczeo.

Cicero represented Germany at the Eurovision Song Contest 2007 in Helsinki his song "Frauen regier'n die Welt" ("Women Rule the World"). He finished 19th.

In 2014, he was one of the stars of the Vox television show "Sing meinen Song – Das Tauschkonzert" (Sing my song – the exchange concert) along with Xavier Naidoo, Sasha, Andreas Gabalier, Sandra Nasić and Gregor Meyle.

In late 2014, Cicero fell ill with chronic fatigue syndrome (also called CFS or myalgic encephalomyelitis), which led to an acute case of myocarditis. On 24 March 2016, he died from a stroke; his father, Eugen Cicero, had also died from the same cause.

Discography

Filmography

Books 
 2010: Weggefährten. Meine Songs fürs Leben, Rowohlt, Berlin .

References

External links

 Official website (in German)
 Official MySpace page (in German and English)
 Video of the song "Frauen regier'n die Welt"
 Amsterdamse Hogeschool voor de Kunsten

1970 births
2016 deaths
German male singers
Eurovision Song Contest entrants for Germany
Eurovision Song Contest entrants of 2007
German jazz singers
Musicians from Berlin
People with chronic fatigue syndrome
German people of Romanian descent
Echo (music award) winners
German male jazz musicians